Richard John Collinson (28 May 1923 – 22 September 2013) was an Australian rules footballer who played with Footscray in the Victorian Football League (VFL).

Collinson served in the Australian Army during World War II prior to playing with Footscray.

Notes

External links 

1923 births
2013 deaths
Australian rules footballers from Victoria (Australia)
Western Bulldogs players
West Footscray Football Club players